The Argentario Aquarium also called Acquario mediterraneo della Costa d'Argento is a mediterranean public aquarium in Italy. It is located in Monte Argentario on the frazione of Porto Santo Stefano. It was inaugurated in 2001.

References

External links

Museums in Tuscany
Aquaria in Italy
Monte Argentario